Warren Wagner may refer to:
 Warren H. Wagner (1920–2000), American botanist 
 Warren Lambert Wagner (born 1950), American botanist